The United Kingdom participated in the Eurovision Song Contest 2004 with the song "Hold Onto Our Love" written by Gary Miller and Tim Woodcock. The song was performed by James Fox. The British entry for the 2004 contest in Istanbul, Turkey was selected via the national final Eurovision: Making Your Mind Up 2004, organised by the British broadcaster BBC. Six acts competed in the national final and the winner was selected entirely through a public vote.

As a member of the "Big Four", the United Kingdom automatically qualified to compete in the final of the Eurovision Song Contest. Performing in position 20, the United Kingdom placed 16th out of the 24 participating countries with 29 points.

Background

Prior to the 2004 contest, the United Kingdom has participated in the Eurovision Song Contest forty-six times. Thus far, the United Kingdom has won the contest five times: in 1967 with the song "Puppet on a String" performed by Sandie Shaw, in 1969 with the song "Boom Bang-a-Bang" performed by Lulu, in 1976 with the song "Save Your Kisses for Me" performed by Brotherhood of Man, in 1981 with the song "Making Your Mind Up" performed by Bucks Fizz and in 1997 with the song "Love Shine a Light" performed by Katrina and the Waves. To this point, the nation is noted for having finished as the runner-up in a record fifteen contests. Up to and including 1998, the UK had only twice finished outside the top 10, in 1978 and 1987. Since 1999, the year in which the rule was abandoned that songs must be performed in one of the official languages of the country participating, the UK has had less success, thus far only finishing within the top ten once: in 2002 with the song "Come Back" performed by Jessica Garlick. For the 2003 contest, the United Kingdom finished in twenty-sixth (last) place out of twenty-six competing entries with the song "Cry Baby" performed by Jemini.

The British national broadcaster, BBC, broadcasts the event within the United Kingdom and organises the selection process for the nation's entry. BBC announced that the United Kingdom would participate in the Eurovision Song Contest 2004 on 8 November 2003. BBC has traditionally organised a national final featuring a competition among several artists and songs to choose the British entry for Eurovision. For their 2004 entry, the broadcaster announced that a new primetime national final involving a public vote would be held to select United Kingdom's entry, replacing the traditional A Song for Europe show more recently aired in a Sunday afternoon timeslot on BBC One.

Before Eurovision

Eurovision: Making Your Mind Up 

Eurovision: Making Your Mind Up 2004 was the national final developed by the BBC in order to select the British entry for the Eurovision Song Contest 2004. Six acts competed in a televised show on 28 February 2004 held at the BBC Television Centre in London and hosted by Terry Wogan and Gaby Roslin. The winner was selected entirely through a public vote. The show was broadcast on BBC One. The national final was watched by 7.2 million viewers in the United Kingdom.

Competing entries 
The BBC collaborated with record label Sony Music UK and an independent music expert to select six finalists to compete in the national final. Five of the entries were provided to the BBC by music industry experts including writers and producers, and the sixth entry, "It Just Gets Better", was provided by the British Academy of Songwriters, Composers and Authors (BASCA) which ran a songwriting competition amongst its members. The six artists were announced on 3 February 2004, while the competing songs were premiered during the BBC One television programme Top of the Pops, hosted by Tim Kash, on 13 February 2004. The songwriters for this year's national final were announced by the BBC as Gary Barlow, Pam Sheyne, Brian Rawling, Brian Higgins and Stuart McLennan, Andy McCluskey and Stuart Kershaw.

Final
Six acts competed in the televised final on 28 February 2004. In addition to their performances, guest performers included previous Eurovision Song Contest winner Sertab Erener, who won the contest for Turkey in 2003 with the song "Everyway That I Can", and Emma Bunton, performing her song "Maybe" and the winning song for the United Kingdom in 1967 "Puppet on a String".

A panel of experts provided feedback regarding the songs during the show. The panel consisted of Lorraine Kelly (journalist and television presenter), Harry Hill (comedian, writer, and television presenter) and Carrie Grant (member of the 1983 British representatives Sweet Dreams, vocal coach and television presenter). A public vote consisting of regional televoting and SMS voting selected the winner, "Hold Onto Our Love" performed by James Fox. The results of each televoting region awarded 2, 4, 6, 8 and 12 points to their top five songs, while the SMS vote was awarded based on the percentage of votes each song achieved. For example, if a song gained 10% of the SMS vote, then that entry would be awarded 10 points. The public vote in the show registered 300,000 votes, with "Hold Onto Our Love" receiving 45% of the votes.

12 points

At Eurovision 
It was announced that the competition's format would be expanded to include a semi-final in 2004. According to the rules, all nations with the exceptions of the host country, the "Big Four" (France, Germany, Spain and the United Kingdom) and the ten highest placed finishers in the 2003 contest are required to qualify from the semi-final in order to compete for the final; the top ten countries from the semi-final progress to the final. As a member of the "Big Four", the United Kingdom automatically qualified to compete in the final on 15 May 2004. In addition to their participation in the final, the United Kingdom also broadcast and voted in the semi-final on 12 May 2004. During the running order draw for the semi-final and final, the United Kingdom was placed to perform in position 20 in the final, following the entry from Poland and before the entry from Cyprus. The United Kingdom placed sixteenth in the final, scoring 29 points.

In the United Kingdom, the semi-final was broadcast on BBC Three with commentary by Paddy O'Connell, while the final was televised on BBC One with commentary by Terry Wogan and broadcast on BBC Radio 2 with commentary by Ken Bruce. The British spokesperson, who announced the British votes during the final, was Lorraine Kelly.

Voting 
Below is a breakdown of points awarded to the United Kingdom and awarded by the United Kingdom in the semi-final and grand final of the contest. The nation awarded its 12 points to Greece in the semi-final and the final of the contest.

Points awarded to the United Kingdom

Points awarded by the United Kingdom

References

2004
Countries in the Eurovision Song Contest 2004
Eurovision
Eurovision